The Thompson Creek mine is one of the largest molybdenum mines in the United States. The mine is located in northern United States in Idaho. The Thompson Creek mine has reserves amounting to 205 million tonnes of molybdenum ore grading 0.06% molybdenum thus resulting 123,000 tonnes of molybdenum.

See also
List of molybdenum mines
Molybdenum mining in the United States

References

Buildings and structures in Custer County, Idaho
Open-pit mines
Molybdenum mines in the United States